Suad Nokić (born 16 August 1993) is a Serbian-Bosniak former footballer.

Early career
Suad Nokić born in Novi Pazar, began his career in his native Serbia playing for young team of FK Novi Pazar. In 2012 he made his debut in Serbian SuperLiga playing against OFK Beograd.

References

External links
 

1993 births
Living people
Bosniaks of Serbia
Serbian footballers
Association football midfielders
FK Novi Pazar players
Serbian SuperLiga players